KBR, Inc. (formerly Kellogg Brown & Root) is a U.S. based company operating in fields of science, technology and engineering. KBR works in various markets including aerospace, defense, industrial and intelligence. After Halliburton acquired Dresser Industries, KBR was created in 1998 when M.W. Kellogg merged with Halliburton's construction subsidiary, Brown & Root, to form Kellogg Brown & Root. In 2006, the company separated from Halliburton and completed an initial public offering on the New York Stock Exchange. 

The company's corporate offices are in the KBR Tower in Downtown Houston.

History

M. W. Kellogg
In 1901, Morris Woodruff Kellogg founded The M. W. Kellogg Company in New York City. The company was incorporated in 1905 and its headquarters was moved to Jersey City, New Jersey. Initially Kellogg's main business was power plant construction and fabrication of power plant components, but the development of hammer forge welding techniques helped ready the company to move into refining as the petroleum industry developed. Kellogg was announced the number one construction company for years 1993 to 1995. This is mainly due to their work in the Dulles Greenway.

Kellogg's entry into process engineering initially focused on the Fleming cracking process, but in the 1920s Kellogg partnered with The Texas Company (Texaco) and Standard Oil of Indiana to purchase the Cross thermal cracking process. Kellogg set up one of the first petroleum laboratories in the country in 1926 to commercialize and then license the technology. This led to Kellogg building some 130 units in the United States and abroad.

In the 1930s and 1940s, Kellogg worked with leading refiners on various technologies. For the war effort, these developments led to the construction of six hydroreformer units, twenty fluid catalytic cracking units, and the only complete refinery built during World War II. Even bigger than the refining work was K-25, the gaseous diffusion plant at Oak Ridge, Tennessee, developed by Kellogg subsidiary the Kellex Corporation, built as part of the Manhattan Project. This period also included the development of the Benedict–Webb–Rubin (BWR) equation of state which has since become an industry mainstay and provided the basis for Kellogg's lead in cryogenics.

The 1950s Kellogg technology expanded into steam pyrolysis, Orthoflow fluid catalytic cracking, phenol-from-cumene and coal-to-synthetic fuels technologies and the 1960s saw the growth in helium recovery, ethylene, and the development of Kellogg's ammonia process. Kellogg maintained New York offices at 225 Broadway in the Transportation Building until 1956 when it moved to 711 Third Avenue in Midtown.

In 1970, Kellogg moved from New York City to Houston, Texas, and in 1975, they completed the move by relocating the research and development lab. The 1970s saw Kellogg become the first American contractor to receive contracts from China. Kellogg's international work expanded with the major ammonia complexes in China, Indonesia, and Mexico as well as LNG liquefaction plant in Algeria and two receiving terminals in the United States, the world's largest LPG plant in Kuwait and four fluid catalytic cracking units in Mexico. The 1980s saw continuation of global activity in LNG and ethylene with millisecond furnaces starting up in the United States.

Kellogg underwent numerous acquisitions and name changes through until 1987, when it was acquired by Dresser Industries, a provider of integrated services and project management for the oil and gas industry. Ten years later, Halliburton acquired Dresser, and combined Kellogg with Brown & Root to create a new, larger subsidiary – Kellogg Brown & Root (KBR).

Brown & Root
Brown & Root was founded in Texas in 1919 by Herman Brown and Daniel Root, with money provided by Root (Brown's brother in law).  Root soon died and Herman Brown's younger brother, George R. Brown, joined the company in 1922 (according to Robert A. Caro's The Path to Power). The company began its operations by building roads in Texas.

One of its first large-scale projects, according to the book Cadillac Desert, was building a dam on the Texas Colorado River near Austin during the Depression years. For assistance in federal payments, the company turned to the local Congressman, Lyndon Johnson. Brown & Root was the principal source of campaign funds after Johnson's initial run for Congress in 1937, in return for persuading the Bureau of Reclamation to change its rules against paying for a dam on land the federal government did not own, a decision that had to go all the way to President Franklin Delano Roosevelt. After other very profitable construction projects for the federal government, Brown & Root gave massive sums of cash for Johnson's first run for the U.S. Senate in 1941.

During World War II, Brown & Root built the Naval Air Station Corpus Christi and its subsidiary Brown Shipbuilding produced a series of warships for the U.S. government. In 1947 Brown & Root built one of the world's first offshore oil platforms.

According to Tracy Kidder's book Mountains Beyond Mountains, Brown & Root was a contractor in the Péligre Dam project. The project was designed by the U.S. Army Corps of Engineers and financed by the Export-Import Bank of the United States.

Halliburton years
Following the death of Herman Brown, Halliburton Energy Services acquired Brown & Root in December 1962. According to Dan Briody, who wrote a book on the subject, the company became part of a consortium called RMK-BRJ that built about 85 percent of the infrastructure needed by the U.S. Armed Forces during the Vietnam War. In 1967, the Government Accounting Office alleged that Brown & Root had been unaccountable with public funds and allowed materials to be stolen. Donald Rumsfeld expressed concern that their contracts were not adequately audited. At this time, protesters derided Brown & Root as a symbol of war profiteering, dubbing the company "Burn & Loot".

In 1989, Halliburton acquired another major engineering and construction contractor, C. F. Braun Inc., of Alhambra California, and merged it into Brown & Root. From 1995 to 2002, Halliburton KBR was awarded at least $2.5 billion to construct and run military bases, some in secret locations, as part of the U.S. Army's Logistics Civil Augmentation Program (LOGCAP).

In September 2005, under a competitive bid contract it won in July 2005 to provide debris removal and other emergency work associated with natural disasters, KBR started assessment of the cleanup and reconstruction of Gulf Coast Marine and Navy facilities damaged in the aftermath of Hurricane Katrina. The facilities include: Naval Station Pascagoula, Naval Station Gulfport, the John C. Stennis Space Center in Mississippi, two smaller U.S. Navy facilities in New Orleans, Louisiana, and others in the Gulf Coast region.

Formation of KBR, Inc.
Halliburton announced on April 5, 2007, that it had separated from KBR, which had been its contracting, engineering, and construction unit as a part of the company for 44 years. The move was prefaced by a statement registered with the United States Securities and Exchange Commission on April 15, 2006, stating that Halliburton planned to sell up to 20 percent of its KBR stock on the New York Stock Exchange (NYSE).  On November 16, 2006, KBR shares were offered for the public in an initial public offering with shares priced at $17. The shares closed up more than 22 percent to $20.75 a share on the first trading day.

On May 7, 2008, the company announced that it would acquire Birmingham, Alabama-based engineering and construction firm BE&K for $550 million.

The company announced on November 7, 2017, that KBR secured a contract to provide astronaut medical support services for the European Space Agency's European Astronaut Center Space Medicine Office in Cologne, Germany.

In May 2019, the company introduced new branding.

In October 2021, KBR purchased UK defence group Frazer-Nash Consultancy from Babcock International Group for a reported £293 million.

Operations
The company is heavily involved in mission support for several government agencies, including NASA, providing training and care for American astronauts.

GICS Code Reclassification
In April 2019, KBR's GICS code was reclassified as an IT consulting company by stock traders. MSCI, a New York private equity firm that manages how companies are classified on various stock exchanges, reclassified KBR as a company specializing in "IT Consulting & Other Services." KBR has made shift away from engineering and construction projects to government contracts that include information technology and other support services. KBR's government services sector accounted for more than 70 percent of the company's $4.9 billion revenue in 2018.

Expansion
In February 2018, KBR announced that it would acquire Stinger Ghaffarian Technologies, a provider of technological solutions as well as mission operations in the aerospace sector, for $355 million.  The acquisition was completed April 25, 2018.

In October 2020, KBR announced it had completed the acquisition of Centauri, LLC, a leading independent provider of space, directed energy, and other advanced technology solutions to the United States intelligence community and Department of Defense, from Arlington Capital Partners.

Office facilities
In 2008, the firm announced that a new office facility would appear at the intersection of the Grand Parkway and Interstate 10 in unincorporated western Harris County, Texas, between Houston and Katy. The new complex would have been in close proximity to the Energy Corridor area of Houston. KBR planned to continue to have a corporate presence in Downtown Houston. In December KBR said that it would not continue with the plans due to a weakened economy.

In January 2010 KBR announced plans to extend its lease and expand its presence in Downtown Houston. The downtown expansion replaced the Harris County plans.

Kosovo
In 1996, Brown & Root was awarded a contract to support U.S. and North Atlantic Treaty Organization (NATO) troops as part of the SFOR operation in the Balkan region. This contract was extended to also include KFOR operations in Kosovo starting in 1999. Camp Bondsteel in Ferizaj, Kosovo, was constructed by the 94th Engineer Construction Battalion together with the private Kellogg Brown & Root (KBR) under the direction of the Army Corps of Engineers.

Afghanistan
KBR was awarded a $100 million contract in 2002 to build a new U.S. embassy in Kabul, Afghanistan, from the U.S. State Department. KBR has also been awarded 15 Logistics Civil Augmentation Program (LOGCAP) task orders worth more than $216 million for work under Operation Enduring Freedom, the military name for operations in Afghanistan. These include establishing base camps at Kandahar and Bagram Air Base and training foreign troops from the Republic of Georgia.

Cuba
KBR has also been actively involved in the development of works in Cuba. Most notably sections of the U.S. Naval base in Guantanamo, completed in 2006. Camp 6, the newest facility built for detainees at Naval Station Guantanamo Bay, is designed after a maximum-security penitentiary in the U.S.

Iraq
In the 2000s, KBR employed more American private contractors and had a larger contract with the U.S. government than any other firm in Iraq. The company's roughly 14,000 U.S. employees in Iraq provide logistical support to the U.S. military. Some U.S. Marines revived the Vietnam-era nickname 'Burn & Loot' as a name for the company during the Iraq War.

In November 2012, a dozen Oregon National Guard soldiers sued KBR for knowingly exposing them to hexavalent chromium, and were awarded more than $85 million; the soldiers were providing security to civilian workers at the Qarmat Ali water facility in 2003.

In January 2019, a case brought against KBR by hundreds of veterans, who claimed the company's practice of burning trash near barracks had sickened them, was refused by the supreme court, which let stand a lower court's ruling against the veterans.

Space and work with NASA
In 2021, NASA awarded KBR and Aerodyne Industries a $531 million contract for systems engineering at NASA’s Goddard Space Flight center in Maryland. KBR also houses the low pressure chamber designed to test the high altitude flying of the new X-59 research aircraft being designed by NASA.

Scientists and engineers working for KBR also contributed to the development and deployment of the James Webb Space Telescope, which launched in 2022, as part of various Mechanical Integration Services and Technology contracts.

Lobbying 
KBR engages third party lobbyists to represent the company in jurisdiction where they have business interests. For example, in South Australia, KBR is represented by lobbying firm MCM Strategic Communications.

Controversy

Questionable charges

In June 2008, Charles M. Smith, the senior civilian Defense Department official overseeing the government's multibillion-dollar contract with KBR during the early stages of the war in Iraq said he was forced out of his job in 2004 for refusing to approve $1 billion in questionable charges by KBR. Smith refused to approve the payments because Army auditors determined that KBR lacked credible records to support more than $1 billion in spending. Smith stated, "They had a gigantic amount of costs they couldn't justify." He said that following this action he was suddenly dismissed and according to one New York Times source "his successors — after taking the unusual step of hiring an outside contractor to consider KBR's claims — approved most of the payments he had tried to block."

Shell companies in Cayman Islands
In March 2008, The Boston Globe reported that KBR had avoided paying hundreds of millions of dollars in federal Medicare and Social Security taxes by hiring workers through shell companies based in the tax haven of the Cayman Islands. More than 21,000 people working for KBR in Iraq – including about 10,500 Americans – are listed as employees of two companies, Service Employees International Inc., and Overseas Administrative Services, which exist on the island only in computer files in an office. KBR admitted that the companies were set up "in order to allow us to reduce certain tax obligations of the company and its employees". But KBR does claim the workers as its own with regards to the legal immunity extended to employers working in Iraq.

Bribing Nigerian officials
On February 6, 2009, the Justice Department announced KBR had been charged with paying "tens of millions of dollars" in bribes to Nigerian officials in order to win government contracts, in violation of the Foreign Corrupt Practices Act (FCPA). A 22-page document filed in a Houston federal court alleged massive bribes in connection with the construction of a natural gas plant on Bonny Island requiring $7.5bn USD. KBR officials had no comment. KBR pleaded guilty and was ordered to pay $402m USD in criminal fines, nearly all of which was covered by Halliburton. KBR and Halliburton also paid $177m USD in disgorgement of profits to the Securities and Exchange Commission (SEC) due a civil complaint filed by the SEC relating to the FCPA charges.

Former CEO Albert Jackson Stanley, who ran KBR when it was a subsidiary to Halliburton, was sentenced to 30 months in prison via plea agreement.

Waxman allegations
The Army's actions came under fire from California Congressman Henry Waxman, who, along with Michigan Congressman John Dingell, asked the General Accounting Office to investigate whether the U.S. Agency for International Development and The Pentagon were circumventing government contracting procedures and favoring companies with ties to the Bush administration. They also accused KBR of inflating prices for importing gasoline into Iraq. In June 2003, the Army announced that it would replace KBR's oil-infrastructure contract with two public-bid contracts worth a maximum total of $1 billion, to be awarded in October. However, the Army announced in October it would expand the contract ceiling to $2 billion and the solicitation period to December. As of October 16, 2003, KBR had performed nearly $1.6 billion worth of work. In the meantime, KBR has subcontracted with two companies to work on the project: Boots & Coots, an oil field emergency response firm that Halliburton works in partnership with (CEO Jerry L. Winchester was a former Halliburton manager) and Wild Well Control. Both firms are based in Texas.

Professional negligence
KBR's maintenance work in Iraq has been criticized after reports of soldiers electrocuted from faulty wiring. Specifically, KBR has been charged by the Army for improper installation of electrical units in bathrooms throughout U.S. bases. CNN reported that an Army Special Forces soldier, Staff Sergeant Ryan Maseth, died by electrocution in his shower stall on January 2, 2008. Army documents showed that KBR inspected the building and found serious electrical problems a full 11 months before his death. KBR noted "several safety issues concerning the improper grounding of electrical devices". But KBR's contract did not cover "fixing potential hazards;" It covered repairing items only after they broke down. Maseth's family has sued KBR. In January 2009, the U.S. Army Criminal Investigation Command investigator assigned to the case recommended that Maseth's official cause of death should be changed from "accidental" to "negligent homicide". KBR supervisors were blamed for failing to ensure electrical and plumbing work were performed by qualified employees, and for failure to inspect the work. In late January 2009, the Defense Contract Management Agency handed down a "Level III Corrective Action Request" to KBR. This is disseminated after a contractor is found being in a state of "serious noncompliance", and is one step from suspending or terminating a contract. In 2011, KBR defended the lawsuit by claiming that Iraqi, not American, law should apply in determining a verdict. Despite these issues, KBR was awarded a $35 million contract for major electrical work in 2009.

Employee safety in warzones
As of June 9, 2008, 81 American and foreign KBR employees and subcontractors have been killed, and more than 380 have been wounded by hostile action while performing services under the company's government contracts in Iraq, Afghanistan and Kuwait. Family members of injured or killed employees have sued the company in relation to the 2004 Iraq KBR convoy ambush.

Sexual assault and abuse allegations

Jamie Leigh Jones testified at a Congressional hearing that she had been gang-raped by as many as seven coworkers in Iraq in 2005 when she was an employee of KBR (a subsidiary of Halliburton at the time), and then falsely imprisoned in a shipping container for 24 hours without food or drink.

Under questioning, Jones denied ever having claimed to have been gang-raped, even though her extensive media appearances say otherwise.

Jones and her lawyers said that 38 women have contacted her reporting similar experiences while working as contractors in Iraq, Kuwait, and other countries. On September 15, 2009, the 5th Circuit Court of Appeals ruled in favor of Jones, in a 2–1 ruling, and found that her alleged injuries were not, in fact, in any way related to her employment and thus, not covered by the contract. On July 8, 2011, a jury in the Southern District of Texas federal court in Houston found against Jones and cleared KBR of any wrongdoing.

Jamie Leigh Jones's case led Senator Al Franken to propose an amendment to the defense appropriations bill, which was passed in October 2009, to allow employees of firms with government contracts access to the courts. Jones's case received an unfavorable verdict and her alleged fabrication caused a subsequent media scandal.

Mary Beth Kineston, an Ohio truck driver, alleged she was sexually harassed and groped by several KBR employees, and was later fired after reporting to the company the threats and harassment endured by female employees.

Jo Frederiksen, another female employee, filed a lawsuit against the company for allegedly being "inappropriately touched, stalked, intimidated and verbally harassed" during her time with the firm in 2003. According to Frederiksen, after she complained to the firm she was moved to an even more hostile location while some of her abusers were promoted. The lawsuit claimed "women are second-rate citizens provided for the pleasure of men" at the firm. Frederiksen also alleged a lack of oversight to "rampant illicit criminal behavior" related to prostitution and human trafficking by other KBR employees.

Human trafficking lawsuit
On August 28, 2008, defense contractor KBR, Inc. and a Jordanian subcontractor were accused of human trafficking in a federal lawsuit filed in Los Angeles. The suit alleged that 13 Nepali men were recruited by Daoud & Partners to work in hotels and restaurants in Jordan, but upon arrival all 13 men had their passports seized by the contractor and were sent to Iraq to work on the Al Asad Airbase. Twelve of the employees were abducted when their unprotected convoy was attacked by a group calling itself the Army of Ansar al-Sunna, while en route to the base. Shortly thereafter, a video was released of one of the men being beheaded and the other 11 shot. The remaining employee, Buddi Prasad Gurung, claims to have been held against his will for 15 months, during which time he was forced to work at the base. Reuters quoted attorney Matthew Handley as saying, "It doesn't appear that any of them knew they were going to Iraq." KBR made no public comment on the lawsuit, but released a statement which stated in part that it, "in no way condones or tolerates unethical or illegal behavior".

"Burn pits" lawsuits
More than 20 federal lawsuits naming KBR and seeking class-action status were filed in late 2008 and 2009 over the practice of operating "burn pits" at U.S. bases in both Iraq and Afghanistan and thus exposing soldiers to smoke containing dioxin, asbestos, and other harmful substances. The pits are said to include "every type of waste imaginable", with items such as "tires, lithium batteries, Styrofoam, paper, wood, rubber, petroleum-oil-lubricating products, metals, hydraulic fluids, munitions boxes, medical waste, biohazard materials (including human corpses), medical supplies (including those used during smallpox inoculations), paints, solvents, asbestos insulation, items containing pesticides, polyvinyl chloride pipes, animal carcasses, dangerous chemicals, and hundreds of thousands of plastic water bottles". A company statement responding to the allegations said that "at the sites where KBR provides burn pit services, the company does so ... in accordance with the relevant provisions" of its contracts as well as "operational guidelines approved by the Army".

Late payment
In the UK in April 2019, Kellogg Brown & Root was suspended from the UK Government's Prompt Payment Code for failing to pay suppliers on time.

Workers stranded in Indian Ocean territory 
On September 16, 2022, the Department of Migrant Workers Secretary, Susan Ople, confirmed a Washington Post report that 800 Filipino workers are stranded at a remote US military base on Diego Garcia in the Indian Ocean due to an employment dispute with their employer which is KBR.

See also

 Top 100 Contractors of the U.S. federal government

References

External links
 
 CalPERS urged to divest from KBR
 Kellogg Brown & Root (Archive)
 Brown & Root (Archive)
 

Companies listed on the New York Stock Exchange
Construction and civil engineering companies of the United States
Engineering companies of the United States
Energy engineering and contractor companies
Private military contractors
Companies based in Houston
George W. Bush administration controversies
Construction and civil engineering companies established in 1998
2006 initial public offerings